Wensley Rinaldo Bundel is a former Surinamese football manager and player who last managed S.V. Transvaal in the Surinamese Hoofdklasse.

As a player, he played in the Hoofdklasse for S.V. Transvaal, and for the Suriname national team, helping Transvaal to five National titles, and two CONCACAF Champions Cups, during one of the clubs' most successful periods. He has also managed H.O.B. (House Of Billiards), Transvaal and the Suriname national team during the span of his career.

He is considered one of the best defensive midfielders in the history of the sport in Suriname, having also helped Suriname to win the CFU Championship in 1978.

Career 
Bundel began his football career in Paramaribo, playing with S.V. Transvaal in the SVB Hoofdklasse, the top flight of football in Suriname. He played in the midfield with Roy Vanenburg and Pauli Corte in the sixties. He was best friends with Roy George, of arch rivals S.V. Robinhood except for on the pitch, where competition was fierce. In 1973, SV Transvaal went undefeated, winning the league title, as well as the CONCACAF Champions Cup, the first for a Surinamese club. They defeated CRKSV Jong Colombia from the Netherlands Antilles 4–2 on aggregate score in the final. In 1974, Transvaal won the league title again, and in 1975 they finished as runners-up in the CONCACAF Champions Cup, losing to Atlético Español from Mexico 5–1 on aggregate score in the final. He also helped Transvaal to the 1981 CONCACAF Champions' Cup finals once more, winning the title 2–1 on aggregate score against C.D. Atlético Marte from El Salvador.
 On 10 January 1982, he played in a friendly match between S.V. Transvaal and AFC Ajax, which ended in a 3–0 loss at the National Stadion.

International career 
Bundel has played for the Suriname national team. He made his debut on 4 October 1970 in a 3–2 win against Trinidad and Tobago, in a friendly match hosted at the National Stadion. He played an important role in the countries 1970 and 1978 FIFA World Cup qualifying campaigns, also helping his team to win the 1978 CFU Championship.

Managerial career
After his playing career, Bundel started in coaching. He was the manager for House Of Billiards, competing in the Hoofdklasse in 2003. In 2005, Bundel coached the Suriname national team at the annual Suriprofs Tournament in Amsterdam, finishing in second place.

In 2007, he coached the Suriname national under-19 team to a first place finish at the Inter-Guyana Games. In 2008, he became the manager of the Suriname national team, ahead of the nations' 2010 FIFA World Cup qualifying campaign. He also managed the team for the 2008 and 2010 Caribbean Cup qualifiers, and the 2010 Parbo Bier Cup.

In 2010, he became the manager of his former club S.V. Transvaal. After four turbulent seasons, and with the club at one point nearly facing relegation, Bundel resigned in 2014. He was succeeded by former Transvaal player Jimmy Letnom.

Personal life
Bundel is the father of former Surinamese International Rosano Bundel who also played for S.V. Transvaal. On 24 March 2012 his Son was sentenced to life in Prison for the murder of George Tabetando in Atlanta, Georgia, United States, in what was known as the Cumberland Mall shootings of 2011. He was 28 years old.

Honours

Player

Club
S.V. Transvaal
 SVB Hoofdklasse (5): 1968, 1969, 1970, 1973, 1974
 CONCACAF Champions Cup (2): 1973, 1981

International
Suriname
 CFU Championship (1): 1978

Coach
Suriname U-19
Inter-Guyana Games (1): 2007

References

External links
 

Living people
Sportspeople from Paramaribo
Surinamese footballers
Suriname international footballers
Surinamese football managers
Suriname national football team managers
S.V. Transvaal players
SVB Eerste Divisie players
S.V. Transvaal managers
SVB Eerste Divisie managers
Year of birth missing (living people)
Association football midfielders